Leonardo Basile (born 12 May 1983 in Naples) is an Italian taekwondo practitioner. In 2005, Basile had won two bronze medals for the over-84 kg class at the World Taekwondo Championships in Madrid, Spain, and at the Summer Universiade in Izmir, Turkey. He also captured a silver medal in the same division at the 2007 Summer Universiade in Bangkok, Thailand, and eventually defeated Slovenia's Ivan Trajkovic for the gold at the 2012 European Taekwondo Championships in Manchester, England. Basile is a member of the taekwondo team for Centro Sportivo Esercito, and is coached and trained by Yoon Soon-Cheul.

Basile qualified for the men's heavyweight division (+80 kg) at the 2008 Summer Olympics in Beijing, after placing second from the European Qualification Tournament in Istanbul, Turkey. He lost the preliminary round of sixteen match to Cuba's Ángel Matos, with a score of 1–3.

References

External links

NBC 2008 Olympics profile

Italian male taekwondo practitioners
1983 births
Living people
Olympic taekwondo practitioners of Italy
Taekwondo practitioners at the 2008 Summer Olympics
Sportspeople from Naples
Taekwondo practitioners at the 2015 European Games
Mediterranean Games bronze medalists for Italy
Competitors at the 2013 Mediterranean Games
Universiade medalists in taekwondo
Mediterranean Games medalists in taekwondo
Universiade silver medalists for Italy
Universiade bronze medalists for Italy
European Taekwondo Championships medalists
World Taekwondo Championships medalists
Medalists at the 2005 Summer Universiade
Medalists at the 2007 Summer Universiade
20th-century Italian people
21st-century Italian people